Allolimosina is a subgenus of flies belonging to the family Lesser Dung flies.

Species
M. albinervis (Duda, 1918)
M. alloneura (Richards, 1952)
M. paralbinervis (Papp, 1973)
M. pseudoalbinervis (Papp, 1973)
M. rotundipennis (Malloch, 1913)
M. secundaria (Duda, 1918)

References

Sphaeroceridae
Insect subgenera
Diptera of Asia
Diptera of North America
Diptera of South America
Brachyceran flies of Europe